Rhyddings (formerly Rhyddings High School and then Rhyddings Business and Enterprise School) is a mixed secondary school located in Oswaldtwistle in the English county of Lancashire. The current headteacher is Andrew Williams, who took over in September 2018.

History
A new “hi tech” building for the school opened in March 2003, which replaced the old annex which had been in used since the 1920s.

The former headteacher was Paul Trickett, who replaced Barry Burke, who was appointed principal of Manchester Health Academy in July 2008. Mr Burke took over from his predecessor, Joyce Moore, in January 1998. Mrs Moore began as headteacher in 1974, being the first woman headteacher at a mixed school in Lancashire.

In December 2013, it was reported that a quarter of teachers faced redundancy, due to more schools competing for fewer pupils. In June 2014, Trevor Ainsworth, the deputy headteacher, announced his retirement from the school, after spending his entire teaching career in Rhyddings, starting in 1977.

The school was inspected by Ofsted in 2014 and judged Good.

In January 2016, the school was named one of "329 Failing Secondary Schools"..

As of 2021, its most recent inspection was in 2018, when it was judged Requires Improvement.

Previously a community school administered by Lancashire County Council, in June 2022 Rhyddings converted to academy status. The school is now sponsored by the LET Education Trust.

Academics
Rhyddings offers GCSEs and BTECs as programmes of study for pupils.

Notable former pupils
Vicky Entwistle, actress
Paul Manning, undercover police officer and whistleblower

References

External links
Rhyddings  official website

Secondary schools in Lancashire
Academies in Lancashire
Schools in Hyndburn